Soho Stories is a 2001 studio album by Welsh jazz singer Ian Shaw.

Track listing
"Comes Love" (Lew Brown, Sam H. Stept, Charles Tobias) – 4:02
"I Never Went Away" (Richard Rodney Bennett) – 4:13
"Ruby" (Janis Ian) – 5:22
"Dearly Beloved" (Jerome Kern, Johnny Mercer) – 3:32
"How Little We Know" (Hoagy Carmichael, Mercer) – 4:23
"A Little Piece of Heaven" (Rob Coral, Sue Hawker) – 2:15
"I Wished on the Moon" (Dorothy Parker, Ralph Rainger) – 3:55
"Be Sure I'll Let You Know" (Ian Shaw, Cedar Walton) – 4:28
"If You Could See Me Now" (Tadd Dameron, Carl Sigman) – 4:03
"Tomorrow Never Came" (Fran Landesman, Simon Wallace) – 5:12
"I Keep Going Back to Joe's" (Marvin Fisher, Jack Segal) – 4:25
"Happy with the Blues" (Harold Arlen, Peggy Lee) – 2:30
"Rainbow Sleeves" (Tom Waits) – 3:37

Personnel
Ian Shaw – vocals, piano, arranger
Papo Vazquez – trombone
Lew Soloff – trumpet
Mark Fletcher – drums
Chip Jackson – double bass
Joe Beck – guitar
Cedar Walton – piano
James Pearson – piano, arranger
Eric Alexander – tenor saxophone
Steve Rubie – flute
Geoff Gascoyne – arranger
Simon Wallace
Production
Jamie Putnam – art direction, design
Katherine Miller – engineer, mixing
Darren Crowdy – executive producer
Joel E. Siegel – liner notes
George Horn – mastering
Michael Semanick – mixing
John Abbott – photography

References

2001 albums
Ian Shaw (singer) albums
Milestone Records albums